Tümen-Odyn Battögs (also Battugs Tumen-Od, ; born August 23, 1981 in Mörön sum, Khövsgöl aimag) is a Mongolian judoka, who played for the half-middleweight category. She won a bronze medal for her division at the 2010 Asian Games in Guangzhou, China.

Battugs represented Mongolia at the 2008 Summer Olympics in Beijing, where she competed for the women's half-middleweight class (63 kg). She received a bye for the second preliminary round match, before losing out, by an ippon (full point) and a kuchiki taoshi (single leg takedown), to Germany's Anna von Harnier.

References

External links
 

 NBC Olympics Profile

1981 births
Living people
People from Khövsgöl Province
Mongolian female judoka
Olympic judoka of Mongolia
Judoka at the 2008 Summer Olympics
Asian Games medalists in judo
Judoka at the 2006 Asian Games
Judoka at the 2010 Asian Games
Asian Games bronze medalists for Mongolia
Medalists at the 2010 Asian Games
21st-century Mongolian women